Vici  is a town in Dewey County, Oklahoma, United States. The population was 699 at the 2010 census.  No information appears on the origins of the town name, but Vici is Latin for “I conquered.”

History

Although it had a couple of nearby predecessor settlements, the current town of Vici was platted on September 11, 1911, at a time when buildings were being moved to the site to be close to the tracks of the newly built Wichita Falls and Northwestern Railway, later part of the Missouri–Kansas–Texas Railroad.  The town became a prosperous agricultural-products shipping point through the 1940s.  Rail service ended in 1972, but activities such as ranching, oil and gas, and a large nursing home became important economic drivers in the modern era.

In 2010 the movie The Dome of Heaven was shot in Vici featuring some local residents in the film, including Mark Randall, Molly Randall, and Travis Dennett and Trey Verhoeff.

The 200MW Persimmon Creek Wind Farm, north-northwest of town, has been online since September 2018.

Geography
Vici is located at  (36.148180, -99.299259).

Vici is at the intersection of U.S. Route 60 and Oklahoma State Highway 34.

Vici Municipal Airport (FAA Identifier: 5O1) is one mile south of town, and features a paved 2565’ x 50’ runway.

Demographics

As of the census of 2000, there were 668 people, 283 households, and 164 families residing in the town. There were 341 housing units at an average density of 801.8 per square mile (306.2/km2). The racial makeup of the town was 97.16% White, 0.60% Native American, 0.30% Asian, 0.60% from other races, and 1.35% from two or more races. Hispanic or Latino of any race were 1.95% of the population.

There were 283 households, out of which 24.4% had children under the age of 18 living with them, 48.8% were married couples living together, 6.7% had a female householder with no husband present, and 41.7% were non-families. 37.5% of all households were made up of individuals, and 21.9% had someone living alone who was 65 years of age or older. The average household size was 2.17 and the average family size was 2.91.

In the town, the population was spread out, with 19.3% under the age of 18, 9.4% from 18 to 24, 23.1% from 25 to 44, 20.8% from 45 to 64, and 27.4% who were 65 years of age or older. The median age was 44 years. For every 100 females, there were 83.0 males. For every 100 females age 18 and over, there were 76.7 males.

The median income for a household in the town was $24,265, and the median income for a family was $36,250. Males had a median income of $29,091 versus $17,500 for females. The per capita income for the town was $13,267. About 12.2% of families and 14.3% of the population were below the poverty line, including 15.3% of those under age 18 and 19.0% of those age 65 or over.

Education
 Vici was annexed into the High Plains Technology Center District on May 12, 2009. Results (Courtesy of Newsok)
 Vici Public Schools

External links

Vici Public Schools

References

 

Towns in Dewey County, Oklahoma
Towns in Oklahoma